The Sal Island Opening Tournament (Portuguese: Torneio de Abertura da Ilha do Sal, Capeverdean Crioulo, ALUPEC or ALUPEK: Turneiu de Abertura Idja du Sal) is an opening tournament competition played during the season in the island of Sal, Cape Verde.  The competition is organized by the Sal Regional Football Association (Associação Regional de Futebol de Sal, ARFS).  The competition is similar to a league cup used in other countries.  The first competition began in the 2000s.

As the league later had two divisions, unlike other islands, the 2015 season had all of the clubs from the first and second divisions competed and extended to 11 rounds with several new clubs who started competing in official competitions.  The group system was restored for the 2016-17 season and had two groups and each round, the leader of each group headed to the final and has two divisions..  The current winner is SC Santa Maria who became the fourth club to win their only title.

Winners

Performance By Club

Listed titles only

Performance by area
Listed titles only

See also
Sports in Sal, Cape Verde
Sal Premier Division
Sal Second Division
Sal Island Cup
Sal Island SuperCup

References

Sport in Sal, Cape Verde
Football cup competitions in Cape Verde